Frederick Clifton Vail (July 31, 1875 – February 1, 1954) was an American football, basketball, and baseball coach.  He served as the head football coach at the University of Richmond in 1903, at Gettysburg College from 1904 to 1906 and again from 1909 to 1911, and at Earlham College from 1907 to 1908, compiling a career college football record of 46–31–5.  At Gettysburg, Vail was also the head basketball coach from 1908 to 1914 and the head baseball coach in 1910 and 1911.

Coaching career
Vail was an assistant at Germantown Academy in Philadelphia and then the University of Pennsylvania under Carl S. Williams.

Vail was the 14th head football coach at the University of Richmond in Richmond, Virginia, serving for one season, in 1903, and compiling a record of 6–3–1.

Death
Vail died on February 1, 1954, in Fort Washington, Pennsylvania.

Head coaching record

Football

References

External links
 

1875 births
1954 deaths
Earlham Quakers baseball coaches
Earlham Quakers football coaches
Earlham Quakers men's basketball coaches
Gettysburg Bullets baseball coaches
Gettysburg Bullets football coaches
Gettysburg Bullets men's basketball coaches
Richmond Spiders football coaches